Potomje  is a settlement in Croatia. It is connected by the D414 road.

Populated places in Dubrovnik-Neretva County